Joe Hurd (born August 25, 1969) is an American technology executive, public company board member and public servant. Currently, he is the Global Managing Director at SOSV, a $750M early-stage venture fund, where he leads strategy and business development efforts for the fund’s life sciences, deep tech hardware and mobile portfolio companies, and a Venture Partner for Good Growth Capital, a female-led venture capital fund. He is an independent non-executive director of GoCo Group plc (LSE: GOCO) d/b/a GoCompare.com, where he sits on the Remuneration and Nomination Committees. In October 2020, he was elected to a 4-year term on the Board of Trustees at Menlo College, and he is a current Director of the American Swiss Foundation. Hurd advises numerous innovative Silicon Valley-based pre-seed and seed stage start-ups on go-to-market strategy, revenue models, and international expansion through his advisory firm, The Katama Group, LLC, with a particular emphasis on diverse founders.

From 2009 to 2012, Hurd served as a political appointee in the United States Department of Commerce during the first term of President Barack Obama. Previously, Hurd was an executive at Facebook, Inc., and was part of the founding management teams at Friendster, Inc. and VideoEgg, Inc. (now SAY Media, Inc.). He is a member of the Council on Foreign Relations (Membership Committee), the National Association of Corporate Directors, and the Trilateral Commission. Between 2013 and 2020, Hurd was a Director and later Chair person of Bullis Charter School. Hurd lives in Los Altos, California.

Early life

Childhood 

Hurd was born in 1969, in The Bronx, New York City to Jean (née Challenger) and Dr. Joseph K. Hurd, Jr. He has a younger brother. His father was a gynecologist at Lahey Clinic in Burlington, Massachusetts and his mother worked as an elementary school teacher and principal in Newton, Massachusetts. Hurd was raised in Wellesley Hills, Massachusetts, and graduated from Wellesley High School in 1987, where he was elected student body president and captained his high school swimming and track teams.

College, graduate school and law school 
In 1987, Hurd enrolled at Harvard College and studied Japanese history and politics. In 1991, he was one of two students in his Harvard class to receive an A.B. cum laude from both the East Asian Studies and Government departments. His senior thesis, on Japan's foreign policy towards South Africa during the apartheid era, was awarded departmental honors.

After college, Hurd was awarded a full-tuition merit scholarship from Mort Zuckerman to study at the School of International and Public Affairs at Columbia University, where he spent one year as a Zuckerman Fellow and International Affairs Fellow in 1991-1992. He pursued a combined field of study while at Harvard Law School, and received a Master of International Affairs degree from Columbia in 1994 and a J.D. from Harvard Law School in 1995.

Personal life 
On May 26, 2002, he married Christina Mireles, an attorney. They have one daughter and two sons.

Career

Early career 

After law school, Hurd served as a Law clerk#Federal clerkships for Judge William G. Young of the U.S. District Court in Boston, Massachusetts. He was admitted to the bar in New York (1996), Massachusetts (1996) and the District of Columbia (1997). From 1996 to 2000, he practiced corporate and securities law in London for Linklaters, the British law firm. While at Linkaters, Hurd qualified as a solicitor of the Senior Courts of England and Wales (1999).

AOL 
In 2000, Hurd joined AOL, Inc. as an Executive Director, AOL International to lead AOL's business development efforts in Japan and Australia. While at AOL's Japanese joint venture, DoCoMo AOL, Hurd negotiated the first deal for AOL to offer its broadband access service outside the United States, and the first deal to distribute AOL Instant Messenger on the popular i-Mode phone network in Japan. He later transferred to AOL|7 Pty, AOL's Australian joint venture, to run business development efforts in Australia and New Zealand.

Friendster 
From early 2004 until early 2006, Hurd was part of the initial management team at Friendster, responsible for Friendster's international operations. While at Friendster, Hurd monetized a user base that grew from 3 million to over 20 million through launching products and services that appealed to a Southeast Asian audience, such as online games, classifieds  and a mobile SMS service.

VideoEgg 
After leaving Friendster, Hurd joined the founders of VideoEgg, Inc. (now SAY Media, Inc.) in 2006 as the company's first business hire. Hurd grew VideoEgg's business from zero to over $30 million in annual revenue, and built sales teams in England and Australia.

Obama Administration 

During 2008, Hurd worked on the Barack Obama presidential campaign, as part of the foreign policy research staff and helping to set up the voter protection effort in Washoe County, Nevada. In mid-2009, Hurd joined the Obama Administration as a Senior Director, Export Promotion and Trade Policy, working at the Commerce Department. While at Commerce, Hurd was the political lead for the Trade Promotion Coordinating Committee, where he helped implement the National Export Initiative.  He authored the first-ever NEI Report to the President as well as the 2011 National Export Strategy,  both of which were delivered to the White House. Hurd also served as a member of the White House Business Council, talking to business leaders nationwide about the importance of export promotion.

Facebook
In 2015, Hurd joined Facebook in Menlo Park, CA to lead the emerging businesses team in the company's Global Marketing Solutions division.  Hurd led a team focused on go-to-market operations and strategy for a number of Facebook's new business initiatives.

Advising startup founders 
In 2003, Hurd founded a business consultancy, the Katama Group, LLC. He advises startup founders on market entry/business development/financing and strategy issues and invests in early-stage companies. Past clients and investments include Outside GC (legal services), Verisk Analytics, Antengo (mobile commerce), UniversityNow (MOOC for working class and first-time college students), FollowAnalytics (mobile app analytics), the Savannah Fund (African venture capital), and FounderDating (entrepreneur-focused social network, sold 2016).

Public service

Bullis Charter School 

In January 2013, Hurd joined the board of directors of Bullis Charter School, the top-ranked charter school in the State of California. Hurd joined Bullis Charter to bring his expertise in public policy and public relations to the school. In 2014, Bullis Charter School entered into a five-year standstill agreement to end outstanding litigation with the Los Altos School District, and Hurd has been quoted in local papers calling for increased dialogue to resolve the lawsuits. Hurd stepped down as Board Chair and President of the Bullis Charter School Board in 2020.

American Swiss Foundation 
In 2011, Hurd was elected to the board of directors of the American Swiss Foundation, a non-profit organization that fosters relations between the two countries. The group represents Switzerland's leading banks, insurance and multinational corporations. Since 2010, Hurd has served as co-chair of the Foundation's alumni council, representing over 1,000 alumni of the annual young leaders program.

Council on Foreign Relations 
Hurd is the Co-Chair of the Diversity Committee and a member of the Committee on Membership of the Board of Directors of the Council on Foreign Relations (CFR). The Committee on Membership meets twice annually to recommend candidates to be elected to CFR membership.

Truman National Security Project 
Hurd is a Senior Fellow with the Truman National Security Project, focusing on international trade and export promotion issues.

Global network 
Since 1986, Hurd has participated in a number of global leadership development programs, hosted by the governments of Spain, Germany, Switzerland, Japan and England. He maintains a rolodex of over 5,000 of the most influential young political, business and media leaders around the world. A partial list of the programs he has participated in follows:
 American Field Service (Japan), 1986
 Japan-America Student Conference (Japan), 1988
 St. Gallen Symposium (Switzerland), 1992 & 1995
 British-American Project (England), 2004
 Atlantik-Brücke (Germany), 2006
 U.S.- Spain Council Young Leaders Program (Spain), 2008
 Transatlantic Network 2020 (EU), 2008
 American Swiss Young Leaders Conference (Switzerland), 2008
 U.S. – Japan Leadership Program (Japan), 2009 & 2010
 Brussels Forum, Young Professionals Summit (Belgium), 2011, 2012 & 2013
 Australian American Leadership Dialogue (Australia), 2012 & 2013
 The Atlantic Dialogues, German Marshall Fund (Morocco), 2013

Support for political candidates 
Hurd is a member of the Democratic Party, and has worked on the issues, Get out the vote and voter protection staff for numerous presidential and senate campaigns, including Michael Dukakis in the 1988 United States presidential election, for Dianne Feinstein in the United States Senate special election in California, 1992, and for Barack Obama in the Barack Obama presidential campaign, 2008 and the Barack Obama presidential campaign, 2012. In September, 2012, Hurd represented the Obama Administration at a "Rock the Vote" event in Madrid, Spain, during the 2012 campaign.

Other pursuits

Media appearances and commentary 

On April 2, 2006, Hurd and his wife, Christina Mireles, were interviewed by Lesley Stahl on the CBS show, 60 Minutes, in a segment titled “Working 24/7” devoted to the impact of technology on the work/life balance. The segment featured Hurd advising global clients and building his advisory practice while balancing life with a new wife and young daughter.

Hurd has been quoted in The Wall Street Journal, The New York Times, Wired, The Straits Times and USA Today.

Publications 
Chapter 3, "Trade" in The Next Chapter: Obama's Second-Term Foreign Policy, Programme Report, Chatham House (UK), Dormandy ed. (January 2013) [report considers some of the major challenges the Obama administration will face over the next four years. Topics covered include: the economy, trade, energy, environment, defence, China, the Middle East and North Africa, India, Afghanistan and Pakistan, Russia, and Europe.]
"US Election Note: International Trade Policy after 2012" part of the Chatham House (UK) Americas Programme AMP PP 2012/02 (June 2012) [examining the likely trade policy of either a second-term Barack Obama administration or an incoming Mitt Romney administration].
2011 National Export Strategy: Powering the National Export Initiative, released by the Trade Promotion Coordinating Committee (June 2011).
Report to the President on the National Export Initiative, released by the Trade Promotion Coordinating Committee (September 2010).

References

External links 
 

1969 births
Living people
American nonprofit executives
Businesspeople from the San Francisco Bay Area
California Democrats
Harvard Law School alumni
Obama administration personnel
People from Wellesley, Massachusetts
United States Department of Commerce officials
School of International and Public Affairs, Columbia University alumni
Wellesley High School alumni
Harvard College alumni